The 1976–77 season of the Moroccan Throne Cup was the 21st edition of the competition.

Raja Club Athletic won the cup, beating Difaâ Hassani El Jadidi 1–0 in the final, played at the Stade de FUS in Rabat. Raja Club Athletic won the cup for the second time in their history.

Tournament

Last 16

Quarter-finals

Semi-finals

Final 
The final took place between the two winning semi-finalists, Raja Club Athletic and Difaâ Hassani El Jadidi, on 17 July 1977 at the Stade de FUS in Rabat.

Notes and references 

1976
1976 in association football
1977 in association football
1976–77 in Moroccan football